The 1889 South African Rugby Board Trophy was the first domestic rugby union competition held in South Africa. It took place after the South African Rugby Board was formed in 1889.

See also

 Currie Cup

References

Currie Cup
1889 in South African rugby union
Currie